1,3-BAC (1,3-bis(aminomethyl)cyclohexane) is an organic molecule belonging to the sub class cycloaliphatic amine. It has the CAS Registry Number of 2579-20-6. Its key use is as an epoxy resin curing agent.

Manufacture 
It has been produced commercially as part of a mixture with the 1,4 derivative. The primary route of manufacture is by catalytic hydrogenation of m-xylylenediamine usually called MXDA.

Uses 

Like most amines it maybe used as an epoxy curing agent. However, the presence of the amino group also means it can be used in polyurethane chemistry by reacting with isocyanates. In this case a polyurea would be produced. It may also be reacted with phosgene (phosgenation) to produce an isocyanate.

Safety 
It is corrosive with a Packing Group I designation.

See also 
 Epoxy
 IPDA
 MXDA 
 PACM
 DCH-99

References 

Amines
Cycloalkylamines
Diamines